A sect is a subgroup of a religious, political or philosophical belief system. It may also refer to:
 Astrology of sect, an ancient astrological concept
 Subepithelial connective tissue graft, also referred as SECT graft

In entertainment 
 Sect (World of Darkness), a large organization of vampires set in World of Darkness
 Sect (band), a Brazilian Eurodance band
 SECT, an American-Canadian hardcore punk band

See also 
 The Sect (disambiguation)